Spotted Island Air Station (ADC ID: N-27B) was a General Surveillance Gap Filler Radar station in the Canadian province of Newfoundland and Labrador, It was located  east of CFB Goose Bay.  It was closed in 1961.

History
The site was established in 1957 as a staffed Gap Filler radar station, built by the United States Air Force, under operational control of Cartwright Air Station and part of the Pinetree Line of Ground-Control Intercept (GCI) radar sites.

The station was assigned to Aerospace Defense Command in 1957, and was given designation "N-27B". Aerospace Defense Command stationed the 922d Aircraft Control and Warning Squadron at the station in 1957.  It operated an AN/FPS-14 staffed Gap Filler search radar.

USAF units and assignments 
Units:
 922d Aircraft Control and Warning Squadron, Activated at Grenier AFB, New Hampshire 26 May 1953
 Moved to Cartwright Air Station, 1 October 1953
 Discontinued 1961

Assignments:
 4732d Air Defense Group (ADC), 1 April 1957
 Goose Air Defense Sector, 1 April 1960

See also
 List of USAF Aerospace Defense Command General Surveillance Radar Stations

References

  A Handbook of Aerospace Defense Organization 1946 - 1980,  by Lloyd H. Cornett and Mildred W. Johnson, Office of History, Aerospace Defense Center, Peterson Air Force Base, Colorado
 Winkler, David F. (1997), Searching the skies: the legacy of the United States Cold War defense radar program. Prepared for United States Air Force Headquarters Air Combat Command.

Radar stations of the United States Air Force
Installations of the United States Air Force in Canada
Military installations closed in 1961
Military installations in Newfoundland and Labrador
1957 establishments in Newfoundland and Labrador
1961 disestablishments in Newfoundland and Labrador
Military installations established in 1957